"We Can Last Forever" is a song that was released as a single from the album Chicago 19, released by the band Chicago in 1989.

The song was sung by Jason Scheff and written by Scheff along with John Dexter. The song peaked at No. 55 on the Billboard Hot 100 and No. 12 on the Billboard Adult Contemporary chart.

References

1989 singles
1988 songs
Chicago (band) songs
Songs written by Jason Scheff
Song recordings produced by Ron Nevison
Full Moon Records singles
Reprise Records singles
Rock ballads
1980s ballads